The Australian Bravery Meeting 78 awards were announced on 25 March 2013 by the Governor General of Australia, the then Quentin Bryce, AC, CVO.

† indicates an award given posthumously.

Star of Courage (SC)

Trevor Ronald Burns , Queensland

Bravery Medal (BM)
Ronald V Strong Queensland Police
Raymond BRUCKNER, Queensland
Stephen Edward de LORENZO, New South Wales
Samuel Julian EDWARDS, New South Wales
Ernst GOMSI, Queensland
Lisa Margaret HALL, New South Wales
Alfred John HARDING †, South Australia
Ryan Jon HARVEY, Western Australia
Bradley Damian HINDMARSH, Queensland
Johnathon Edward KLAASSEN, Queensland
David Eric LOWRY, South Australia
Inspector Bruce James McNAB, Queensland Police
Samuel James MATTHEWS †, Queensland
Sollee MORRIS, Western Australia
Brett MORRISSEY, Queensland
Bubby Kopaki TUHIWA, Western Australia
Con VARELA, New South Wales
Nathan Christopher VISSCHER, New South Wales
Russell Robert VON NIDA, Queensland
Ross James WOODTHORPE ANDERSON, New South Wales

Commendation for Brave Conduct

Marlene AGGETT
Dianne ANVER
Brendon W ASHBY
Sergeant Allan Richard ASHMAN of the Australian Army
Ronald Dale BARASSI 
Mitchell Edwin BEARE
Ian Frederick BLAND
Jason BRAY
Craig John BROWNLOW
Tristan James BURNETT
Captain Ian Michael CARTER of the Australian Army
Senior Constable Steven James CLAIR, Queensland Police
Paul Denzil CLACKETT
Brian Patrick DELL
Shane Ross DEVLIN
David Andrew DONALDSON
Peter Raymond FENTON †
Shane Ronald FLEXMAN
Constable Stuart Adam GREENWELL, Queensland Police
Sergeant Glen John GUNTHORPE, Queensland Police
Warren HABAK
Bryce Lewis HERTSLET
Douglas Glen HISLOP
Kevin James HUGHES
Paul Manuel INACIO †
Senior Sergeant Perry James IRWIN †, Queensland Police
Sergeant William Kendall JOHNSON, Queensland Police
David William KLAASSEN
Constable Peter Kevin LAMBERT, Queensland Police
Tammee Lee LYNN
Bernard William McCAFFERY
Peter James McCARRON
Luke Matthew McCORMACK
Bradley Peter MILLS
Andrew Eglinton MITCHELL
Wayne David MURPHY
Deane William MURRELL
Andrew Kenneth NEIL
Supreeda PHENGCHAEM
Raymond ROBINSON
Steven Ronald RULE
John Matthew SACCHETTI
Sergeant David Jefferson SAMPSON, Queensland Police
Aiden Mark SIBRAVA
Constable Matthew SLATTERY, New South Wales Police
Sam Wilson TOLDI 
Jeffrey John van AALST
James Edward WILKIN
Robert John WILKIN
Constable Steven John WILLIAMSON, Queensland

Group Bravery Citation
Awardees are several members of the Queensland Fire and Rescue Service Swift Water Rescue team, involved in a rescue in the Lockyer Valley during the Queensland floods January 2011:
Nathan Cole CHADWICK, Queensland
Geoffrey Mervyn DIXON, Queensland
Mark Andrew MEIER, Queensland
Philip Karl PAFF, Queensland
Mark STEPHENSON, Queensland
Kerry John WEIR, Queensland

Awardees are the helicopter crew ‘Firebird 460’ during the Queensland Floods in the Lockyer Valley on 10 January 2011:
John Andrew McDERMOTT, Queensland
Simon John McDERMOTT, Queensland
Benjamin James SUTHERLAND, Queensland

Awardees are the helicopter crew ‘Helitak 220’ during the Queensland Floods in the Lockyer Valley on 10 January 2011:
Kris LARKIN, New South Wales
Edward LEE, New South Wales
Matthew O'BRIEN, New South Wales
Kendall Rurri THOMPSON, New South Wales

Awardees are members of Queensland Police who rescued several people in the Lockyer Valley during the Queensland floods January 2011:
Inspector Stephen John DABINETT
Senior Sergeant David Richard EDDEN
Senior Sergeant Timothy Allan PARTRIGE
Sergeant Tony Del VECCHIO
Senior Constable Kim Edward BEVIS
Senior Constable Jason Michael BUTLER
Senior Constable Dean William GEORGE
Senior Constable Summer NORTON
Senior Constable Paul Andrew ROWLAND
Senior Constable Jamie VEA VEA
Senior Constable Peter Chee WONG
Senior Constable Shane Francis WRIGHT
Constable Andrew Charles CHEE

Awardees are members of the public who secured moving vessels on the flooded Burnett River at Bundaberg, during the Queensland floods on 30 December 2010:
John SCHOTT,  Queensland
Ian WILLETT, Queensland

Awardees are members of Queensland Police who rescued several people in Grantham during the Queensland floods on 10 January 2011:
Inspector Bradley John WRIGHT
Sergeant Justin Edward MALLORY
Senior Constable Brett Michael DUKE
Senior Constable Matthew Anthony GROOM
Senior Constable Brett William HAMPSON
Senior Constable Jonathon Arrow LARMORE
Senior Constable James WORTHINGTON
Senior Constable Nathan Andrew WRIGHT 

Awardees are members of the public who rescued several people in Grantham during the Queensland floods on 10 January 2011:
Christopher John FORDEN,  Queensland
Iain Scott GRAY, Queensland
Allan James PAYNE,  Queensland
Peter Paul van den ELSEN, Queensland

Awardees are Naval cadets from TS Ipswich, as volunteer boat crews, and one member of Queensland Police, who rescued several people from Goodna during the Queensland floods on 12 January 2011:
Senior Constable Jonathon Edward KIRKMAN
Andrew Phillip SHORTLAND
Cassandra Louise BROADFOOT
Andrew D'Arcy KELLY
Jonathan Andrew KLAEBE
Frank Kerswell MARTIN
Justin Luke MARTIN
James Richard RUNHAM 
Brendon David WEBER

Awardees are a crew of an Emergency Management Queensland rescue helicopter in the Lockyer Valley during the Queensland floods on 10 January 2011.
Mark McKnight KEMPTON,  Queensland
Daren William PARSONS, New South Wales
Doctor Glenn Edward RYAN, Queensland
Illya Jon SELMES, Queensland
Mark Donald TURNER, New South Wales

Awardees are a crew of an Emergency Management Queensland rescue helicopter in the Lockyer Valley during the Queensland floods on 10 January 2011.
Brett Terence KNOWLES, Queensland
Peter Richard ROW, Queensland
David TURNBULL,  Queensland
Stuart John WARK, Queensland

Awardees are several members of the public who rescued two people from a burning vehicle near Goulburn, New South Wales on 13 May 2011.
Shane Michael ELLEM, New South Wales
Malcolm John PEDEN, New South Wales
Justin Craig ROWLES, New South Wales

Awardees are members of the public who assisted victims of a motor vehicle accident at Merton, Victoria on 3 May 2009.
Anthony David BLACK, Victoria
John Douglas CLAPTON, Victoria
Ann GREEN, Victoria
Jason Edward KNEEBONE, Victoria
Matthew Nicholas ROBERTS, Victoria
Geoffrey Richard STEPHENS, Victoria
Kenneth Edward SUSSEX, Victoria

Awardees are members of the public who rescued a woman caught in a rip at Tallows Beach, New South Wales on 27 November 2008.
Edward James ADCOCK, New South Wales
Zachary John BROOKER, New South Wales
Christopher Richard JARVIS, New South Wales
Bernard William McCAFFERY, New South Wales
Ross James WOODTHORPE ANDERSON, New South Wales

Awardees are members of the public who rescued a woman from a submerged vehicle at Maroochydore, Queensland on 24 February 2011. 
Joshua Andy MACPHERSON, Queensland
Rebecca Anne MURRELL, Queensland
Sam Wilson TOLDI, Queensland

Awardees are members of the public who rescued of a family of four from a burning vehicle at Sassafras, Victoria on 29 December 2011. 
Brian Stanley CORNISH, Victoria
Nicholas John GASCOIGNE, Victoria
Donald MacGregor ORR, Victoria
Steven Ronald RULE, Victoria
Yvonne Mary RULE, Victoria

References

Orders, decorations, and medals of Australia
2013 awards